Valley Records was a mid 20th century United States based record label, headquartered in Knoxville, Tennessee.

See also
 List of record labels

Defunct record labels of the United States